Dan Rickwood (born 29 October 1968), known professionally as Stanley Donwood, is an English artist and writer. Since 1994, he has created all the artwork for the rock band Radiohead with their singer Thom Yorke, plus Yorke's other projects, including Atoms for Peace and the Smile. He has published three collections of short stories.

Career
Rickwood uses the pen name Stanley Donwood. He said: "I like to separate the person I am at home — washing up, vacuuming, picking up the kids from school and so on — from whoever Stanley Donwood is."

Radiohead 
Donwood and the Radiohead singer Thom Yorke met as art students at the University of Exeter. Donwood said his first impressions of Yorke were that he was "Mouthy. Pissed off. Someone I could work with." Yorke wrote: "I met him first day at art college ... I figured I'd either end up really not liking this person at all, or working with him for the rest of my life."

Yorke asked Donwood to produce the cover art for Radiohead's 1994 EP My Iron Lung. Donwood was not a fan of rock music, and said he took the work because he knew Yorke. He said in 2015: "[Radiohead] wasn't my cup of tea at all. Now they have seen sense and are a lot more electro. I like their stuff now." With Yorke, Donwood has since provided artwork for all of Radiohead's releases and promotional material. 

Donwood works as Radiohead record, allowing the music to influence the artwork. In 2002, Donwood and Yorke won a Grammy Award for Best Recording Package for the special edition for the album Amnesiac. Donwood contributed to Kid A Mnesia Exhibition, a 2021 interactive experience with music and artwork from Kid A and Amnesiac. He also creates artwork for Yorke's solo records and Yorke's bands Atoms For Peace and the Smile.

Exhibitions 
In 2006, Donwood's exhibition "London Views" consisted of a series of fourteen lino prints of various London landmarks being destroyed by fire and flood. The prints were exhibited at the Lazarides Gallery in London. The prints were used as the cover and insert art for Yorke's first solo album, The Eraser (2006).

In November 2006, Donwood exhibited the original paintings and other artwork done by him and Yorke for Radiohead albums, at Iguapop Gallery in Barcelona. The exhibit focused on Kid A, Amnesiac and Hail to the Thief as well as a companion art book called Dead Children Playing which was produced, credited to Donwood and Tchock. In May 2015, Donwood opened an exhibition of Radiohead artwork, The Panic Office, in Sydney, Australia. Yorke composed an original soundtrack for the exhibition. In 2021, Donwood designed a Radiohead-themed Brompton bicycle to be auctioned for the charity Crew Nation. 

In October 2021, Donwood and Yorke curated an exhibition of Radiohead artwork at Christie's headquarters in London. Donwood auctioned paintings and other artwork he created for Radiohead's 2000 album Kid A.

Writing 
Donwood has published three collections of short stories: Slowly Downward: A Collection of Miserable Stories (2001), Household Worms (2011) and Bad Island (2020). Donwood also contributed stories to The Universal Sigh, a free single-issue newspaper created to promote Radiohead's 2011 album The King of Limbs. In 2019, he published a memoir about his work, There Will Be No Quiet.

Six Inch Records 
In late 2006, Stanley Donwood, along with Richard Lawrence, launched an independent record company, Six Inch Records. The label released three albums, with 333 copies of each. The CDs were packaged by hand into sleeves that were six inches square. All mechanised operations – printing, cutting and scoring  – were carried out using a 1965 Heidelberg platen press. On 18 February 2009, Donwood announced that Six Inch Records had closed.

Other work 
In 2006, Donwood began creating and selling large screenprints. In an interview with AllMusic, he explained it as an effort to reconnect with the process of print making and as a means to share his art in a larger format than the small, low quality prints in album cover and insert art, "It's a way of getting pictures out in the way they should be seen; not as 4-colour litho on cheap paper, but as real pieces of artwork that have a much greater visual impact."

Donwood has created book covers for the nature writer Robert Macfarlane. In 2021, he collaborated with Macfarlane on an edition of Thomas Hardy's poems published by the Folio Society. Donwood provided the illustrations for the poems selected and introduced by Macfarlane. Donwood's illustrations were exhibited at the Jealous Gallery in London in 2021 and the Fine Foundation Gallery at Durlston Castle in Durlston Country Park in 2021.

Bibliography 

(1998) Small Thoughts – printed on eleven circular cards, housed in a tin
(2001) Slowly Downward: A Collection of Miserable Stories
(2002) Catacombs of Terror!
(2003) Tachistoscope
(2007) Dead Children Playing – with Thom Yorke
(2011) Household Worms
(2012) Holloway – with Robert Macfarlane and Dan Richards
(2014) Humor
(2019) Stanley Donwood: There Will Be No Quiet
(2020) Bad Island
(2021) Fear Stalks the Land! — with Thom Yorke
(2021) Kid A Mnesia Art Catalogue — with Thom Yorke

References

External links

English artists
Grammy Award winners
Alumni of the University of Exeter
Living people
Radiohead
1968 births
Album-cover and concert-poster artists